Leaseweb is a German cloud computing and web services company with offices in the continents of Europe, Asia, and North America.

Leaseweb is a subsidiary of OCOM, an internet services company headquartered in Bonn, Germany.

History 
Leaseweb was founded in 1997 by Dutch pilots Con Zwinkels and Laurens Rosenthal.

In 1998, Leaseweb acquired its first servers and set up their first office in Utrecht. By 2005 the company owned 5,000 servers, a number that had doubled to 10,000 two years later.

In 2007, Leaseweb relocated the company headquarters to the Amsterdam area.
In 2010, Leaseweb acquired German hosting provider Netdirekt.
In 2016, Leaseweb acquired the Illinois based Nobis Technology Group, and its Ubiquity Hosting operations.
In 2018, Leaseweb USA acquired ServInt, a Northern Virginia-based web hosting and managed hosting services for cloud IT operations.

Leaseweb Network 
The company operates eighteen data centers in Europe, Asia and the United States. Leaseweb peers with Internet exchanges in Amsterdam, Stockholm, Warsaw, Budapest, Vienna, Frankfurt, Dusseldorf, Zurich, Brussels, Paris, Luxembourg, London, Madrid, Washington DC, New York, Miami, Chicago, Atlanta, Dallas, Phoenix, Los Angeles, Palo Alto, Seattle, San Jose, Hong Kong and Singapore.

Network and datacenters 
The company operates eight datacenters in Europe, Asia and the United States. Leaseweb peers with Internet exchanges in Amsterdam, Frankfurt, London, New York City, Brussels, Stockholm, Madrid, Zurich, Düsseldorf, Paris, Warsaw, Budapest, Milan, Vienna, Prague, Luxembourg, Bucharest, Bratislava, Copenhagen, Oslo, Ashburn, Miami, Chicago, Dallas, Palo Alto and Los Angeles. Leaseweb's network consists of 55 Points-of-Presence and 33 Internet Exchanges across the globe. The network has a bandwidth capacity of 5.9 Tbit/s with peak traffic about 2.5 Tbit/s and reports uptime of 99.9999%

References 

Internet hosting